Mark Northover (27 March 1950 – 6 June 2004) was a British actor with dwarfism, whose best-known screen character was Burglekutt in the 1988 film Willow. Another memorable role was that of Alvy in Hardware. Outside cinema, he made an appearance in the music video for Depeche Mode's "Walking in My Shoes".

Mark Northover died at 54 of a heart attack in Upton, Dorset. He was survived by wife Patsy and namesake son Mark.

Filmography

External links

Actors with dwarfism
English male film actors
English male television actors
1950 births
2004 deaths
Male actors from Dorset
People from Poole